Allium rupicola is a species of onion found in Israel, Turkey, Lebanon and Syria. It has a rosette of leaves plus a scape bearing an umbel of pink flowers.

References

rupicola
Flora of Western Asia
Flora of Egypt
Plants described in 1896
Taxa named by Pierre Edmond Boissier